Grasshopper chess is a chess variant, in which the pawns are allowed to promote to a fairy piece, the grasshopper. The grasshopper (shown as an inverted queen) must hop over other pieces in order to move or capture.

In some variations grasshoppers may also be present on the board in the opening position, in addition to the usual pieces. For example, pawns can be moved forward and grasshoppers put along the second and seventh ranks as shown on the diagram at right. Another possibility is to replace queens with grasshoppers in initial position, while pawns can still be promoted to queens. Grasshoppers are capable of moving as a queen but must jump over a piece and land one spot past the piece that they jump. Pawns are not allowed to go twice for their initial move.

References

External links 
 Grasshopper chess by Hans Bodlaender, The Chess Variant Pages

Chess variants